Belgium competed at the 2004 Summer Paralympics in Athens, Greece. The team included 25 athletes, 24 men and one woman. Competitors from Belgium won 7 medals, including 3 gold, 2 silver and 2 bronze to finish 36th in the medal table.

Medallists

Sports

Athletics

Men's track

Men's field

Cycling

Men's road

Equestrian

Shooting

Men

Swimming

Table tennis

Men

Women

Wheelchair rugby
The men's rugby team didn't win any medals, they were 6th out of 8 teams.

Players
Ludwig Budeners
Koen Delen
Peter Genyn
Christophe Hindricq
Lars Mertens
Guy Michem
Bob Vanacker
Ronny Verhaegen

Tournament

See also
Belgium at the Paralympics
Belgium at the 2004 Summer Olympics

References 

Nations at the 2004 Summer Paralympics
2004
Summer Paralympics